Tennis is an American indie pop band from Denver, Colorado, United States, made up of husband-and-wife duo Alaina Moore and Patrick Riley. The duo formed in 2010, and released their debut album, Cape Dory, in 2011. Their second album, Young & Old, was released the following year. Their third album, Ritual in Repeat (2014), was released on Communion records. 

The band's fourth album, Yours Conditionally, was released in 2017, followed by Swimmer in 2020. Swimmer was named one of the best albums of 2020 by USA Today. Their sixth studio album, Pollen, was released on February 10, 2023.

Background
Alaina Moore (born May 9, 1985) and Patrick Riley (born September 9, 1986) met in a philosophy class while both were students at the University of Colorado, Denver in 2008. The couple started the band after they returned from an eight-month sailing expedition down the Eastern Atlantic Seaboard after their graduation. Moore had initially intended to go to law school. The songs on the band's first album would come to document their experiences sailing. Prior to forming Tennis, Moore's earliest singing experience was in church choirs during her youth.

Career

2010–2013: Cape Dory and Young & Old
Their first releases, both in July 2010, were the "Baltimore" EP on the Underwater Peoples label and the "South Carolina" single on Fire Talk. Tennis released their first studio album, Cape Dory on Fat Possum Records in January 2011. The album, featured on NPR, was based on the couple's experiences during their sailing trip.

During their first tour, James Barone joined the band on drums.

The second Tennis album, Young & Old, was released on Fat Possum Records on February 14, 2012, produced by Patrick Carney of The Black Keys, preceded by the single "Origins", which was issued on Forest Family Records on December 6, 2011.

Tennis released a number of covers as self-released (digital) singles during 2011-2012, including versions of "Tell Her No" by the Zombies, "Is It True?" by Brenda Lee, "Tears in the Typing Pool" by Broadcast and "Guiding Light"  by Television.

American Songwriter named Tennis their Writer of the Week for the week of April 23, 2012.

The band made several television appearances during 2012, performing "Origins" on The Tonight Show with Jay Leno on March 21, "It All Feels the Same" on Late Night with David Letterman on April 9, and "My Better Self" and "High Road" on Conan on July 25.

2014–2015: Small Sound and Ritual in Repeat
In November 2013, Tennis released a 5-song EP titled Small Sound on Communion Records. It was previewed through Pitchfork Advance on October 29, 2013. In May 2014, the band supported sister-act Haim on their North American spring tour.

Their third album, Ritual in Repeat, was released on Communion in September 2014 to critical acclaim. In a feature on the album, NPR Fresh Air'''s Terry Gross said, "Can you re-invent lively pop from the distant past? ...songwriting team Tennis does just that with their new third album, Ritual in Repeat", while NPR's critic Milo Miles stated, "On Ritual in Repeat, it's like Moore and Riley discover just how much ancient Latin, or in this case extinct pop styles, is their natural language". Barone left the group in 2015.

On March 29, 2015, Tennis performed at Burger Records' Burgerama 4 festival in Santa Ana, California, and two songs from that set, "I'm Callin" and "Never Work for Free", were later aired on the May 7 episode of Last Call with Carson Daly. Tennis were also selected to perform on April 1, 2015 at the United Artists Theater at the Ace Hotel in Los Angeles for "The Music of David Lynch" event, hosted by the David Lynch Foundation.

2016–2018: Yours Conditionally and We Can Die Happy

In early 2016, Moore and Riley once again set out on a sailboat journey in the Pacific Ocean, intended to provide inspiration for their next album, with their sailing experience being blogged by Urban Outfitters.

The band's fourth and first self-produced album, Yours Conditionally, was released March 5, 2017 on the band's own label Mutually Detrimental. Record club Vinyl Me, Please chose Yours Conditionally as its "album-of-the-month", and the album debuted at No. 3 on Billboards Alternative Albums chart and No. 2 on the Vinyl Albums chart.

Tennis appeared at the 2017 Coachella Valley Music and Arts Festival, and toured supporting Spoon and the Shins.

On November 9, 2017, Tennis released the EP We Can Die Happy, preceded by the singles "No Exit" and "I Miss That Feeling". The band toured North America from November 2017 to February 2018 in support of the project.

2019–2022: Swimmer
On November 8, 2019, Tennis released a new single, "Runner," followed by "Need your Love" on January 20, 2020, and "How to Forgive" four days later.  These three songs appeared as tracks 4, 2, and 3 (respectively) on Tennis's fifth album, released February 14, 2020, titled Swimmer, again self-produced on Moore and Riley's Mutually Detrimental label.

On October 9, 2020, Tennis released a cover of the song "Superstar."

Due to the COVID-19 pandemic, the band postponed its 2020 tour for Swimmer, with plans to tour the United States with Molly Burch from June 3 to November 17, 2021.

In 2021 Tennis collaborated with the cartoon show Rick and Morty  to produce the song “Borrowed Time”, which aired on episode 9 of Season 5, “Forgetting Sarick Mortshall”. The song was credited to “Rick and Morty and Tennis”.

2022–present: Pollen
On November 15, 2022, Tennis released the single "One Night with the Valet" and announced their sixth studio album Pollen, which was released on February 10, 2023 by Mutually Detrimental, Moore and Riley's label. A video for the song was released on December 13. The band released the second single "Let's Make a Mistake Tonight" alongside a music video for the track on January 10, 2023.

Band membersCurrent members Alaina Moore – vocals, keyboards, guitar (2010–present)
 Patrick Riley – guitar, bass guitar (2010–present)Current touring musicians Steve Voss – drums (2015–present)
 Ryan Tullock – bass (2017–present)Former touring musicians' James Barone – drums (2011–2015)

Discography

Studio albums
 Cape Dory (Fat Possum, January 2011)
 Young & Old (Fat Possum, February 2012)
 Ritual in Repeat (Communion, September 2014)
 Yours Conditionally (Mutually Detrimental, March 2017)
 Swimmer (Mutually Detrimental, February 2020)
 Pollen (Mutually Detrimental, February 2023)

EPs
 Small Sound (Communion, November 2013)
 We Can Die Happy'' (Mutually Detrimental, November 2017)

Singles
 "Baltimore" (Underwater Peoples, July 2010)
 "South Carolina" (Fire Talk, July 2010)
 "Is It True?" (self-released, June 2011)
 "Tell Her No" (self-released, October 2011)
 "Tears in the Typing Pool" (self-released, December 2011)
 "Origins" (Forest Family, December 2011)
 "My Better Self" / "Petition" (ATP, May 2012)
 "Guiding Light" (self-released, September 2012)
 "I'm Callin'" (Communion Records, August 2014)
 "Easter Island" (Universale Music Group North America, May 2015)
 "Ladies Don't Play Guitar" (Mutually Detrimental, August 2016)
 "In the Morning I'll Be Better" (Mutually Detrimental, December 2016)
 "Modern Woman" (Mutually Detrimental, January 2017)
 "My Emotions Are Blinding" (Mutually Detrimental, February 2017)
 "No Exit" (Mutually Detrimental, August 2017)
 "I Miss That Feeling" (Mutually Detrimental, October 2017)
 "Runner" (Mutually Detrimental, November 2019)
 "Need Your Love" (Mutually Detrimental, January 2020)
 "How to Forgive" (Mutually Detrimental, January 2020)
 "Superstar" (Mutually Detrimental, October 2020)

References

External links

Official site

2010 establishments in Colorado
Alternative rock groups from Colorado
American musical duos
Dream pop musical groups
Indie pop groups from Colorado
Indie rock musical groups from Colorado
Musical groups established in 2010
Musical groups from Denver
Rock music duos
Fat Possum Records artists
Male–female musical duos